Jessie Valentine (née Anderson)  (18 March 1915 – 6 April 2006) was a Scottish amateur golfer who won the British Ladies Amateur in 1937, 1955 and 1958.  In 1937, after winning the British Ladies title at Turnberry she was the world number one ranking ladies golfer. In 1959, Valentine was the first woman golfer to be appointed as an MBE for services to golf and was inducted into the Scottish Sports Hall of Fame in 2003.

Career
Valentine was born in Perth, Scotland in 1915.  Her father was for some time the professional at Craigie Hill Golf Club in Perth.  She started playing golf age five, was trained by her father, and was entered into the British Girls Championships at Stoke Poges in 1932. She went onto win the Girls Amateur Championship in 1933. Valentine became one of the dominant figures in women's golf for a period which spanned two decades from the mid-1930s to the mid-1950s. In the 1930s, women had little chance of playing out with the amateur system, as there was no professional tournaments or jobs as club professionals were extremely rare.

In 1935, Valentine became the New Zealand Ladies Champion, and the following year the French Ladies Champion.  She was a member of the Great Britain and Ireland Curtis Cup team in 1936, famously holing a 60-foot putt on the 18th hole at Gleneagles to secure a win and help the team tie with the United States. She represented Great Britain & Ireland in the Curtis Cup seven times between 1936 and 1958.

Valentine won her first British Ladies title at Turnberry in 1937 beating Doris Park (daughter of the famous Willie Park, Jnr from Musselburgh, Scotland) 6&4 in the final.  In 1938 she won the first of her six victories in the Scottish Ladies' Amateur Championship and retained the title in 1939. Between 1939 and 1945 she did not compete due to the Second World War.

Valentine won the Scottish Ladies' Amateur Championship in 1951, 1953, 1955 and 1956.  In 1955, she won her second British Amateur title at Royal Portrush having been runner up in 1950. In 1957 she won the Spalding Women's Open Stroke Play at Moor Park. Valentine won the British Amateur title for the third and final time at Hunstanton Golf Club, Norfolk in 1958, her third final in four years. She went into the tournament with a remarkable record and was rated as one of the favorites and she certainly lived up to those expectations. In contrast to her two previous successes the 1958 win was a much tighter affair, with Valentine overcoming Elizabeth Park by a single hole in closely contested match. In 1960, at the age of 45, Valentine turned professional.

Partnered with John Behrend, Valentine won the Worplesdon Mixed Foursomes three years in succession from 1963 to 1965. She reached the final again in 1968, playing with Richard Brown. In 1969 she was runner-up in the Astor Prince's Trophy.

Valentine's career was the subject of a retrospective exhibition at Perth Museum and Art Gallery in 2019. His life and career were also the subject of a biographical book, Wee Jessie: Jessie Valentine: Whose Golf Swing Lasted a Lifetime, written by Dr Eve Souslby and launched at the exhibition in 2019.

Notable wins
Girls Amateur Championship – 1933
British Ladies Amateur – 1937, 1955, 1958
Scottish Ladies' Amateur Championship – 1938, 1939, 1951, 1953, 1955, 1956
New Zealand Ladies – 1935
French Ladies – 1936
Source:

Team appearances
Amateur
Curtis Cup (representing Great Britain & Ireland): 1936 (tie), 1938, 1950, 1952 (winners), 1954, 1956 (winners), 1958 (winners)
Vagliano Trophy (representing Great Britain & Ireland): 1947 (winners), 1949 (winners), 1951 (winners), 1955 (winners)

Awards
 Appointed a Member of The Order of the British Empire (MBE) in the 1959 New Year Honours for services to women's golf.
 Awarded the Frank Moran Trophy in 1967 for the 'Scot who has done most for the game of golf'.
 Inducted into the Scottish Sports Hall of Fame in 2003.
Inducted into Scottish Women in Sport Hall of Fame in 2020.

References

Scottish female golfers
Amateur golfers
Winners of ladies' major amateur golf championships
Members of the Order of the British Empire
Sportspeople from Perth, Scotland
1915 births
2006 deaths